Visitation is a collaborative album by Bill Laswell and Jonah Sharp. It was released on August 12, 1994 by Subharmonic.

Track listing

Personnel 
Adapted from the Visitation liner notes.

Musicians
Bill Laswell – musical arrangements, producer, photography
Jonah Sharp – musical arrangements, producer

Technical
Layng Martine – assistant engineer
Robert Musso – engineering, programming
Aldo Sampieri – design

Release history

References

External links 
 
 Visitation at Bandcamp

1994 albums
Collaborative albums
Bill Laswell albums
Albums produced by Bill Laswell
Subharmonic (record label) albums